Galesh Kola-ye Pain (also Romanized as Gālesh Kolā-ye Pā’īn; also known as Pā’īn Gālesh Kolā) is a village in Bahnemir Rural District, Bahnemir District, Babolsar County, Mazandaran Province, Iran. At the 2006 census, its population was 891, in 228 families.

References 

Populated places in Babolsar County